Championship Baseball is a sports video game developed by Activision's Gamestar division in 1986.

Gameplay

This baseball simulation has a split-screen view, which gives the player a first-person perspective of the action, whether he is pitching or playing defense.

Reception
Computer Gaming World stated that Championship Baseball was a worthy sequel to Gamestar's Star League Baseball. In 1988, Dragon gave the game 3½ out of 5 stars.

Reviews
Commodore Format - Jun, 1993
Commodore User - Jun, 1987
Your Sinclair - Mar, 1990

References

External links

Championship Baseball at GameSpot

1986 video games
Activision games
Amiga games
Amstrad CPC games
Apple II games
Atari ST games
Baseball video games
Commodore 64 games
DOS games
Multiplayer and single-player video games
ZX Spectrum games